Cristofari is an Italian surname. Notable people with the surname include:

Fabio Cristofari (died 1689), Italian Baroque painter
Giovanni Cristofari (born 1993), Italian footballer
Jacques Cristofari (born 1978), French footballer
Pietro Paolo Cristofari (1685–1743), Italian artist

Italian-language surnames
Patronymic surnames
Surnames from given names